The Yard-O-Led Pencil Company is a manufacturing company founded in London, England in 1934 by German immigrant, Ludwig Brenner, to produce his patent propelling pencils which contained twelve three inch leads (that is to say, 36 inches or a yard of lead). After World War II the company merged with Sampson Mordan Ltd whose founder had patented the first mechanical pencil in 1822. They built a new factory in Birmingham and took over Edward Baker Ltd, another pencil maker.

In 1988, the company was acquired by Filofax Group, which owned it until 2015, when it was re-established itself as "Imperial Yard Ltd". Yard-O-Led continues to produce fountain and ballpoint pens pens as well as mechanical pencils; most of which are made from hallmarked sterling silver.

References

Further reading 
 Collecting Old Pencils, John Watkins, Collectors Press (1970,) ASIN: B000J2HUQG
 Victorian Pencils: Tools to Jewels, Deb Crosby, Schiffer Publishing Ltd (Oct 1998), 
 The Pencil: A History of Design and Circumstance, by Henry Petroski

External links
 Official website
 Yard-O-Led: The Most Traditional Writing Instruments You’ve Never Heard Of

Fountain pen and ink manufacturers
Manufacturing companies based in London
Pencil brands
Manufacturing companies established in 1934
British brands
1934 establishments in England
Stationers of the United Kingdom